Tumhari Paakhi (: Your Paakhi) (International title: Forever Yours)  is an Indian soap opera based on Saratchandra Chattopadhyay's novel Naba Bidhan and produced by Shashi Sumeet Productions that was telecasted on Life OK from 11 November 2013 to 21 November 2014. The series starred Shraddha Arya, Mohammed Iqbal Khan and Varun Badola.

Plot

Two childhood friends, Anshumaan and Paakhi are forced to marry as children by their families. However, misunderstandings and tensions in the families leads them to separate and grow up in different cities and lifestyles.

20 years later

Anshuman is a successful elite businessman. He has a 7-year-old son, named Ayaan from his second wife Meera, who died 3 years prior in an accident. Paakhi still longs for him and believes that one day Anshumaan will come to reunite with her. Anshumaan plans to marry Tanya, the daughter of a well-known businessman, leading to him finding out about his hidden child marriage's truth, as he cannot marry Tanya before divorcing Paakhi. Under pressure from the media, Anshumaan is forced to bring Paakhi to his house in order to save his reputation, with the intention of divorcing her while the latter refuses as she has always loved him. Paakhi finds it hard to fit in his way of living while having to face challenges thrown at her by Anshumaan's sister, Lavanya, but she finds solace in Girish (Lavanya's husband) who always supports her. Anshumaan gradually falls in love with her. Ayaan hates Paakhi, believing she wants to take his late mother's place in Anshumaan's life, but later develops a motherly bond with Paakhi.

Due to misunderstandings created by Tanya and Lavanya, Anshumaan is led to believe Paakhi is having an extra-marital affair and he questions her character. Paakhi is disappointed in Anshumaan for not trusting her, hence decides to leave the house. Anshumaan later realises his misconception and decides to bring Paakhi back. Paakhi unites Anshuman with Devki, his long-lost mother, who was abused and banished by his father. They both clear their misunderstandings and confess their love.

Anshuman's twin brother, Aryaman kills him. Shattered and heartbroken, Paakhi looks after Anshuman's businesses. Under her family's pressure, she later marries Anshuman's cousin, Veer Pratap Singh and adopts a troubled teenager, named Ria. However, Veer decides to divorce Paakhi, realising she can never move on from Anshuman. In the end, Paakhi begins living with his memories and Ayaan, declaring she will always love Anshuman, and fulfill all his duties and wishes.

Cast

Main
Shraddha Arya as Paakhi Shekhawat: Suraj's sister, Anshumaan and Veer's ex wife, Ayaan and Ria's foster mother
Mohammed Iqbal Khan as 
 Anshumaan Rathore: Devki's son, Lavanya and Aryamaan's brother, Veer and Nadika's cousin, Paakhi's late first husband, Ayaan's father
 Aryamaan "Billu" Rathore: Devki's son, Lavanya and Anshumaan's brother, Veer and Nadika's cousin
Varun Badola as Veer Pratap Singh: Nadika's brother; Lavanya, Anshumaan and Aryamaan's cousin; Paakhi and Meera's former husband; Ayaan and Ria's foster father

Recurring
Rukhsar Rehman as Lavanya Rathore: Devki's daughter; Anshumaan and Aryamaan's sister; Veer and Nadika's cousin; Girish's wife; Naina's mother
Sachin Shroff as Girish Bhargava: Lavanya's husband; Naina's father
Anita Raj as Devki / Anuja: Lavanya, Anshuman and Aryaman's mother
Jasmine Avasia as Ria Pratap Singh: Paakhi and Veer's adopted daughter
Divyam Dama as Ayaan Rathore / Ayaan Pratap Singh: Meera and Anshumaan's son; Paakhi and Veer's adopted son
Madhura Naik as Tanya Rana: Vikrant's daughter, Anshumaan's former fiancé
Tej Sapru as Vikrant Rana: Tanya's father
Vijay Kalvani as Ashok
Geetanjali Singh as Deepika
Priyanka Bhole as Nadika Pratap Singh: Veer's sister; Lavanya, Anshumaan and Aryamaan's cousin
Pushkar Goggiaa as Prithvi Kumar Chopra
Indraneil Sengupta as Rohan Bhasin
Rishi Khurana as Suraj Shekhawat: Paakhi's brother
Dolly Minhas as Girish's aunt
Vijayendra Kumeria as Vikram Rajawat
Parakh Madan as Suman Saxena

References

External links

2013 Indian television series debuts
2014 Indian television series endings
Indian drama television series
Life OK original programming
Television shows based on Indian novels
Shashi Sumeet Productions series